Gabriel Carlos Tellas (born 10 August 1992) is an Argentine professional footballer who plays as a forward for C.D. Cobreloa.

Career
Chacarita Juniors were Tellas' opening senior team. He made his bow in professional football on 10 September 2011 versus Atlanta, with Héctor Rivoira substituting the forward on in a goalless draw. Tellas scored his first goal during his eleventh appearance against Guillermo Brown; who won the fixture 5–2. Santamarina of Torneo Argentino A loaned Tellas on 15 August 2012. Three appearances followed. A further loan away then arrived, as he agreed terms with Ituzaingó. He scored twice across 2013–14 in Primera C Metropolitana. A permanent stint with Olimpo came in 2014; though he didn't feature in the Primera División.

In January 2016, Tellas completed a move to Dock Sud. Thirty-six matches and seven goals occurred in the fourth tier. Fellow Primera C Metropolitana outfit Argentino signed Tellas on 30 June 2017. He scored twenty times for them in his first season, as they lost in the promotion play-off finals to Justo José de Urquiza. Tellas, though, did go up to Primera B Metropolitana after being signed on loan by All Boys in July 2018. He made his debut in a draw with San Miguel in the succeeding month, which was followed by a hat-trick over Tristán Suárez in October.

Career statistics
.

References

External links

1992 births
Living people
People from Formosa, Argentina
Argentine footballers
Argentine expatriate footballers
Association football forwards
Primera Nacional players
Torneo Argentino A players
Primera C Metropolitana players
Primera B Metropolitana players
Chacarita Juniors footballers
Club y Biblioteca Ramón Santamarina footballers
Club Atlético Ituzaingó players
Olimpo footballers
Sportivo Dock Sud players
Argentino de Quilmes players
All Boys footballers
Club Atlético Mitre footballers
Cobreloa footballers
Argentine expatriate sportspeople in Chile
Expatriate footballers in Chile